

Season summary
Gary Mills was sacked in November with Notts County in 21st position. Long-serving midfielder Ian Richardson was appointed caretaker manager for the remainder of the season and guided County to 18th place. He was replaced by former Iceland, Stoke City and Barnsley manager Guðjón Þórðarson.

Players

First-team squad
Squad at end of season

Left club during season

References

Notes

Notts County F.C. seasons
Notts County